Kristen Dalton (born Kristen V. Hocking; February 14, 1973) is an American actress who has appeared in television shows, especially USA Network's The Dead Zone.

Life and career
Dalton was born in San Diego County, California. Dalton got her first break when she played a small role in Tango & Cash in 1989. She also played a small role in A Night at the Roxbury in 1998. She appeared as Jack Nicholson's character Frank Costello's girlfriend Gwen in The Departed (2006).

Dalton is perhaps best known for her role as reporter Dana Bright in USA Network's The Dead Zone, starring Anthony Michael Hall.

Dalton's other television appearances include Beverly Hills, 90210, Murder, She Wrote, Diagnosis Murder, Sliders, Stargate SG-1, and CSI: NY. She has also appeared in TV movies, such as Danielle Steel's Family Album, They Nest, Surviving Gilligan's Island (2001) (in which she portrayed actress Tina Louise), Babysitter Wanted and Gleason.

She married fellow actor Darren Jack Dalton on August 8, 1993. They divorced in 2009.

References

External links
 
 

1973 births
Living people
20th-century American actresses
21st-century American actresses
Actresses from San Diego
American film actresses
American television actresses